The Manager of the Month is an association football award that recognises the best La Liga manager each month of the season.

Winners

Multiple winners
The below table lists all the people that have won on more than one occasion.

Awards won by nationality

Awards won by club

Footnotes

References

La Liga trophies and awards
Spanish football trophies and awards